Andrew C. Skinner (born 1951) was a dean of religious education at Brigham Young University and the author of a wide variety of books and articles on historical and doctrinal topics.  Skinner previously served as the executive director of the Neal A. Maxwell Institute for Religious Scholarship.

Biography 

Skinner grew up in Colorado.  From 1970 to 1972 he was a missionary for the Church of Jesus Christ of Latter-day Saints (LDS Church) in the California Central Mission.  He received his bachelor's degree from the University of Colorado.

Skinner holds a master's degree in theology from Harvard University and a Ph.D. in history from the University of Denver.  Prior to joining the faculty of Brigham Young University, Skinner was a religion instructor at Ricks College for four years.

Skinner is a co-author of Jerusalem: The Eternal City.  He has written several books related to the death and resurrection of Jesus Christ including The Garden Tomb.  Among Skinner's works are several articles on LDS doctrinal topics in the Encyclopedia of Latter-day Saint History, as well as the article on Abraham Lincoln in that volume. He wrote an article for the LDS magazine "Ensign" entitled The Book of Abraham: A Most Remarkable Book wherein he discusses LDS cosmology.  Skinner also wrote the article on Lincoln's Presidency in the Encyclopedia of North American History.  He co-authored Joseph: Exploring the Life and Ministry of the Prophet with Susan Easton Black.

Skinner has served in several positions in the LDS Church including serving multiple times as a bishop. He has also served as a member of the Church's Correlation Evaluation Committee.

Skinner is married to Janet Corbridge.  They are the parents of six children.

Notes

References

1951 births
20th-century Mormon missionaries
American leaders of the Church of Jesus Christ of Latter-day Saints
American Mormon missionaries in the United States
Brigham Young University faculty
Brigham Young University–Idaho faculty
Harvard Divinity School alumni
Living people
Latter Day Saints from Colorado
University of Colorado alumni
University of Denver alumni
Maxwell Institute people
Latter Day Saints from Massachusetts
Latter Day Saints from Idaho
Latter Day Saints from Utah